Zichy mansions

In Hungary 
 Zichy Mansion, Aba
 Zichy-Mansion, Ács (Esterházy–Liechtenstein–Zichy-kastély)
 Zichy Mansion, Hosszúpályi
 Zichy Mansion, Lengyeltóti
 Zichy Mansion, Rajka
 Zichy Mansion, Nágocs
 Zichy Mansion, Nagyvázsony
 Zichy Mansion, Óbuda
 Zichy Mansion, Sárszentmihály
 Zichy Mansion, Somlószőlős
 Zichy Mansion, Soponya
 Zichy Mansion, Tetétlen
 Zichy Mansion, Vajta
 Zichy Mansion, Várpalota
 Zichy Mansion, Zichyújfalu
 Zichy Mansion, Zsámbék